Paranthrene insolita is a moth of the family Sesiidae. It is found in large parts of Europe, Turkey, Iraq, the Levant and the Palestinian Territories.

The larvae feed on Quercus species, Populus canadensis, Populus pyramidalis and possibly Salix alba. They bore in the thick branches of their host plant in the tree canopy. They create a brown parchment-like cocoon of loose texture covered with fairly coarse sawdust. Pupation takes place in a short tunnel.

Subspecies
Paranthrene insolita insolita (Turkey)
Paranthrene insolita hispanica Špatenka & Laštuvka, 1997 (southern Spain)
Paranthrene insolita mardina Špatenka & Laštuvka, 1997 (south-eastern Turkey, northern Iraq, the Levant, Palestine)
Paranthrene insolita polonica Schnaider, [1939] (north-eastern Spain, southern France, central Italy, Poland, Germany, Slovakia, the Czech Republic, Hungary, Dalmatia, Ukraine, Bulgaria)

References

Moths described in 1914
Sesiidae
Moths of Europe
Moths of Asia